Life Goes On is the fourth studio album by American rapper Trae. It was released on October 23, 2007, via G-Maab Entertainment, Rap-A-Lot Records, Asylum Records and Atlantic Records. The album features guest appearances from Jody Breeze, Jadakiss, Slim Thug, Styles P and Yung Joc among others. The album was supported by lead single: "Screwed Up" featuring Lil Wayne.

The S.L.A.B.-ED version of the album was released on December 8, 2007. DJ Pollie Pop created this version of the album through his account on Myspace. To date, the album has sold 12,500 copies in its first week.

Track listing

Sample credits
"Against All Odds" contains a portion of "Deadly Combination", specifically 2Pac's verse.
"Nuthin' 2 a Boss" contains samples of "Winter Sadness" performed by Kool and the Gang, and "I'm a D-Boy" performed by Lil Wayne.
"Smile" contains a sample of "Your Smile" performed by Angela Winbush.
"Give My Last Breath" contains the chorus of Trae's earlier single, "Swang", in which was part of Big Hawk's rap. The song also is a tribute to the late Big Hawk.
"Gittin' High" contains samples of "Sensuality I & II" performed by The Isley Brothers, and "Wanna Be a Baller" performed by Fat Pat.
"Ghetto Queen" contains samples of "Living Inside Your Love" performed by Earl Klugh, and "Pain" performed by 2Pac (This is the same sample that were used from one of Salad Fingers' popular videos).
"The Truth" contains a sample of "I Want to Thank You" performed by One Way.

Charts

References

External links

2007 albums
Trae tha Truth albums
Rap-A-Lot Records albums
Albums produced by Mike Dean (record producer)